The 2022 Ohio Valley Conference men's basketball tournament was the conference tournament concluding the 2021–22 season of the Ohio Valley Conference (OVC). The entire tournament, contested during March 2–5, 2022, was played at the Ford Center in Evansville, Indiana. The winner, the Murray State Racers, received the conference's automatic bid to the 2022 NCAA tournament.

Seeds 
Only the top eight teams in the conference qualified for the tournament. Teams were seeded by record within the conference, with a tiebreaker system to seed teams with identical conference records. The first tiebreaker was head-to-head results between the tied teams and the second tiebreaker was comparing each team's record against individual teams in the conference starting with the top-ranked team and working down until they are no longer tied.

Schedule

Bracket

* denotes number of overtime periods

References 

Tournament
Ohio Valley Conference men's basketball tournament
Basketball competitions in Evansville, Indiana
College basketball tournaments in Indiana
Ohio Valley Conference men's basketball tournament
Ohio Valley Conference men's basketball tournament